Kolchak, Kolçak or Kolčák is a surname. Notable people with the surname include:

 Iliash Kolchak ("Kolchak-Pasha") (fl. before 1710–1743), Moldavian mercenary and military commander
 Alexander Kolchak (1873–1920), Russian naval commander, head of anti-Bolshevik White forces
 Eşref Kolçak (1927–2019), Turkish actor
 Kristián Kolčák (born 1990), Slovak football midfielder

See also 
 Kolchak Island (Kolchaka Island), an island in the Kara Sea
 Kolchak: The Night Stalker, an American television series of 1974-1975, or its main character, Carl Kolchak
 Colceag